Bakun may refer to:
Bakun, Benguet, a third class municipality in Benguet Province, Philippines
Bakun Dam, an embankment dam in East Malaysia
Bakun, a colloquial form of the Russian male first name Avvakum